Giulio  Canani (1524 – 27 November 1592) was an Italian Cardinal of the Roman Catholic Church.

Early life
Born in Ferrara to Luigi Canani and Lucrezia Brancaleone, he studied both canon and civil law in the University of Ferrara and he became cleric in Ferara. Later he went to Rome and in 1552 he was appointed papal datary by Pope Julius III.

Episcopate
He was elected bishop of Adria on November 26, 1554.

Cardinalate
Giulio Canani was nominated for the cardinalate by Duke Alfonso d'Este of Ferrara. He was created cardinal priest in the consistory of December 12, 1583 by Pope Gregory XIII, and was assigned the titular church of Sant'Eusebio on November 28, 1584.

He participated in the two conclaves of 1590.

He was transferred to the see Diocese of Modena on February 8, 1591. Later he opted for the title of S. Anastasia on March 20, 1591.

He participated in the Papal conclave of 1591 and in the Papal conclave of 1592.

Death
Giulio Canani died on November 27, 1592 in his native town Ferrara during a short visit there.

References

External links and additional sources
 (for Chronology of Bishops) 
 (for Chronology of Bishops) 

1524 births
1592 deaths
16th-century Italian Roman Catholic bishops
Bishops of Adria
Bishops of Modena
16th-century Italian cardinals